Karl Heinrich Franz von Gareis (24 April 1844 in Bamberg – 15 January 1923 in Munich) was a German legal scholar and Old Catholic writer.

He studied law at the universities of Munich, Heidelberg and Würzburg, obtaining his habilitation for private law at Würzburg in 1870. In 1873 he became a law professor at the University of Bern, specializing in private law. Later on, he served as professor at the universities of Giessen (from 1875), Königsberg (from 1888) and Munich (from 1902). From 1878 to 1881 he was a member of the National Liberal Party in the German Reichstag.

Since 2009 the "Carl-Gareis-Preis" is awarded by the University of Bayreuth Faculty of Law and Economics for outstanding dissertations in the field of legal history or intellectual property.

Published works 
In 1887 he published a monograph on concepts and methods in legal science, Enzyclopädie und Methodologie der Rechtswissenschaft:  Einleitung in die Rechtswissenschaft, whose third edition 1905 was translated into English by Albert Kocourek, with an introduction by Roscoe Pound, as Introduction to the Science of Law: Systematic Survey of the Law and Principles of Legal Study (1911, reissued 1968).

Other principal writings by Gareis are:
 Staat und Kirche in der Schweiz (1877)
 Allgemeines Staatsrecht (1883)
 Institutionen des Völkerrechts (1888)
 Die Litteratur des Privat- und Handelsrechts:  1884 bis 1894 (1896)
 Deutsches Kolonialrecht (1902)
 Vom Begriff Gerechtigkeit (1907)

He was also an editor of the journal Blätter für Rechtsanwendung.

References 

1844 births
1923 deaths
People from Bamberg
Academic staff of the University of Bern
Academic staff of the University of Königsberg
Academic staff of the Ludwig Maximilian University of Munich
Academic staff of the University of Giessen
Jurists from Bavaria
German Old Catholics